Šejla Kamerić (born 1976) is a Bosnian visual artist.

Early life and education 
Šejla Kamerić was born in Sarajevo, Bosnia and Herzegovina. As a child she lived in Dubai, where her father worked for several years as a volleyball coach. Her family returned to Sarajevo in the wake of the Yugoslav wars.  When the war in Bosnia and Herzegovina started, Šejla Kamerić was just 16 years old with a successful career as a model for local and international fashion magazines and brands. She continued her modeling career during the early years of the war. During the Siege of Sarajevo, she graduated from the High School for Applied Arts, and enrolled in the Academy of Fine Arts Sarajevo, graduating from the Graphic Design department after the war. Between 1994 and 1997, she worked with the design group Trio, a group of young artists who designed a series of postcards Greetings from Sarajevo (1993) in order to draw international attention to the situation in the besieged Sarajevo. In 1997, she started to exhibit regularly in Sarajevo and internationally. During this period and until 2000, she was the art director of the advertising agency Fabrika. Since 2003 she was a member of the European Cultural Parliament. She was awarded with DAAD Artists-in-Berlin Program Fellowship in 2007 and continued to live and work in Berlin as a freelance artist. In 2011, Kamerić received The ECF Routes Princess Margriet Award for Cultural Diversity. Today she lives and works between Sarajevo and Berlin.

Artistic practice 
Šejla Kamerić works with various media such as film, photography, objects and drawings. The all-pervading element in her work are her – often uneasy – memories. Based on her own experiences, memories and dreams, her work takes us to global spaces of displacement and discrimination, insisting that the delicate and the sublime are not pushed aside by catastrophe or hardship. Rather, they exist simultaneously, revealing a complex, psychogeographic landscape and the tenacity of the human spirit. The sadness and beauty, the hope and pain that emerge are part of the stories we share.

Dunja Blažević in the catalogue of the exhibition “In the Gorges of the Balkans”, Fridericianum Museum, Kassel, Germany, 2003 wrote:

"What makes Šejla and the entire group of “war generation” artists essentially different from other members of their generation is the meaning inherent in their works, as opposed to the materials they use. Furthermore, in pursuing her work without worrying about what art really is or isn't, she proves herself a member of that generation born in the age of mass-media, in which the main references are the media and the reality around them, and not the history of art."

Exhibitions and screenings 
In 1997, Kamerić exhibited her work for the first time at the annual exhibition organized by SCCA - Sarajevo Center for Contemporary Art and curated by its director and renown art historian Dunja Blažević. In the following years, Kamerić worked closely with Blažević and continued to collaborate with SCCA. In this period Kamerić started to exhibit internationally. In 2000, she was invited to Manifesta III (entitled Borderline Syndrom) in Ljubljana, Slovenia. For this occasion, she made the installation EU/Others which received international acclaim and later became part of the TATE Modern collection.

Since then Kamerić has done numerous installations and interventions in public space: Closing The Border (2002); Bosnian Girl (2003); Pink Line vs. Green Line (2006); Ab uno disce omnes (2015), BFF (2015); SUMMERISNOTOVER (2014–2020).

Kamerić’s works have been on view in solo exhibitions at prestige art institutions such as Portkus in Frankfurt am Maine (2004); Galerie im Taxispalais in Innsbruck (2008); mumok in Vienna, Röda Sten Centre for Contemporary Art and Culture in Gothenburg, Wip: Konsthall in Stockholm and Centre Pompidou in Paris (2010); Museum of Contemporary Art in Zagreb, Camera Austria in Graz, ArtAngel in London and MACBA, Barcelona (2011); MG+MSUM - Museum of Contemporary Art in Ljubljana, Museum of Contemporary Art in Belgrade, Kunsthaus Graz, Sharjah Art foundation - Sharjah Art Museum and CAC Contemporary Art Centre in Vilnius (2012).

2015 was marked by two extensive solo exhibitions, at ARTER Space for Art, Istanbul and the National Gallery of Kosovo, Pristina. In the same year, Kamerić’s highly ambitious project Ab uno disce omnes, commissioned by Wellcome Collection, was shown in London as part of the exhibition Forensics: The anatomy of crime.

Her first short film What Do I Know premiered in the Corto Cortissimo section of the Venice International Film Festival in 2007 and has been screened since in more than 40 international film festivals. The film was awarded with Best Short Film at the 5th Zagreb Film Festival in 2007 and Best Fiction Film at International Adana Film Festival in 2008. A collaborative film project 1395 Days Without Red, done with Anri Sala and Ari Benjamin Meyers and produced by ArtAngel premiered at the Manchester International Festival in 2011. In the same year the film has been screened at the 17th Sarajevo Film Festival; MACBA, Barcelona and MSU - Museum of Contemporary Art, Zagreb. In 2015, Kamerić collaborated with Thai film director Anocha Suwichakornpong on a short film Thursday which premiered at the 44th International Film Festival Rotterdam 2015.

Kamerić has participated in numerous group exhibitions: The Real, The Desperate, The Absolute, Forum Stadtpark, Steirischer Herbst Festival, Graz, (2001); One Hundred Years of Contemporary Art of Bosnia and Herzegovina, National Gallery of Bosnia and Herzegovina, Sarajevo (2001); Prague Biennale; The Gorges of the Balkans, Kunsthalle Fridericianum, Kassel (2003); Passage d'Europe, Musée d'Art Moderne, Saint-Etienne (2004); Taboo / Tirana Biennale (2005); 15th Biennale of Sydney (2006); Tales of Time and Space, 1st Folkestone Triennial, Folkestone, (2008); Baltic Biennial of Contemporary Art, Szczecinie (2009); Gender Check: Femininity and Masculinity in the Art of Eastern Europe, mumok in Vienna and Zachęta National Gallery of Art, Warszaw (2010); Gwangju Biennale (2012); Tokyo Metropolitan Museum of Photography (2013); Hannah Ryggen Triennale, National Museum of Decorative Arts and Design, Trondheim (2016); The Restless Earth, Nicola Trussardi Foundation and La Triennale di Milano (2017); The Warmth of Other Suns: Stories of Global Displacement, The Phillips Collection in partnership with the New museum, Washington, D.C.; 2nd Coventry Biennial of Contemporary Art, Coventry; 4th Berliner Herbstsalon, Maxim Gorki Theater, Berlin (2019).

Works and films 

1999  Zauzeto/Occupied
2000  EU/Others
2001  Basics
2002  Closing the Border
2002  Dream House
2003  Bosnian Girl
2004  FREI
2004  Imagine
2004  Untitled/Daydreaming
2005  Pink Line vs Green Line
2005  Sorrow
2006  30 Years After
2006  Pink Line vs. Green Line 
2008  I Remember I Forgot
2009  If I Sleep It Will Be Double 
2010 - 2012 Hooked
2011 - 2012  Red Carpet 
2012  Ballot Box
2012  Measure
2013  June Is June Everywhere 
2013 - 2019 Fragile Sense of Hope (Xglass) 
2014  SUMMERISNOTOVER
2014  Missing 
2015  Ab uno disce omnes 
2015  BFF
2015  Embarazada
2015  Liberty
2017  Maze 
2018  Keep Away From Fire
2019  We Come With A Bow
2019  Behind the Scenes I

Films 

 2007  What do I know
2010  Glück 
2011  1395 Days Without Red (in collaboration with Anri Sala and Ari Benjamin Meyer) 
2013  Apollo - The First War Cinema (in collaboration with Almir Palata and Mark Casans)
2013  Shifts
2015  Thursday (in collaboration with Anocha Suwichakornpong)

Awards 

 2004 ONFURI Award, National Art Gallery in Tirana
 2004 Sloboda/Freedom Award, International Peace Center (Sarajevo Winter Festival) in Sarajevo
 2005 Special Award, 46th October Salon in Belgrade (in collaboration with Uroš Đurić for work Parallel Life)
2007 Best Short Film Award at the 5th Zagreb Film Festival
2007 Best Fiction Film Award at the 15th International Adana Film Festival
 2007   DAAD-Berlin Artist Residency Fellowship
 2011 The ECF Routes Princess Margriet Award for Cultural Diversity

Collections 
Šejla Kamerić's works have been included in numerous collection worldwide, such as TATE Modern, London; Musée d'Art Moderne de la Ville, Paris; MACBA – Barcelona Museum of Contemporary Art; Museum Boijmans Van Beuningen, Rotterdam; Museum of Contemporary Art, Zagreb; Kontakt. The Art Collection of Erste Group and ERSTE Foundation, Vienna; Art Collection Telekom, Bonn; Vehbi Koç Foundation Contemporary Art Collection (2007+), Istanbul, permanent exhibition at the Memorial Center Potočari, Srebrenica and others.

References

External links 
 Šejla Kamerić Official website
Šejla Kamerić at Galerie Tanja Wagner, Berlin 
 

Artists from Sarajevo
Bosnia and Herzegovina photographers
Bosnia and Herzegovina video artists
Living people
1976 births
Bosnia and Herzegovina women artists
20th-century Bosnia and Herzegovina artists
21st-century Bosnia and Herzegovina artists